Antonio Balducci, O.P. (died 1580) was a Roman Catholic prelate who served as Bishop of Trevico (1576–1580).

Biography
Antonio Balducci was ordained a priest in the Order of Preachers (Dominicans).
In 1570 he served as Inquisitor in Bologna and handled the trial of Geralomo Cardano. On 6 February 1576, during the papacy of Pope Gregory XIII, he was appointed as Bishop of Trevico.
He served as Bishop of Trevico until his death in 1580.

References

External links and additional sources
 (for the Chronology of Bishops using non-Latin names) 
 (for the Chronology of Bishops using non-Latin names)  

16th-century Italian Roman Catholic bishops
Bishops appointed by Pope Gregory XIII
1580 deaths
Dominican bishops